Resonant inverters are electrical inverters based on resonant current oscillation. In series resonant inverters the resonating components and switching device are placed in series with the load to form an underdamped circuit. The current through the switching devices fall to zero due to the natural characteristics of the circuit. If the switching element is a thyristor, it is said to be self-commutated.

Applications
This type of inverter produces an approximately sinusoidal waveform at a high output frequency, ranging from 20 kHz to 100 MHz, and is commonly used in relatively fixed output applications, for example, induction heating, sonar transmitters, fluorescent lighting, or ultrasonic generators.  Due to the high switching frequency, the size of the resonating components is small.

Configurations
There are various configurations of series resonant inverters, depending on the connections of the switching devices and load. The series inverters may be classified into two categories:
 Series resonant inverters with unidirectional switches.
 Series resonant inverters with bidirectional switches.

See also
 Electronic oscillator
 Fluorescent lamp Inverter

References

Power electronics handbook: devices, circuits, and applications, by M. H. Rashid

Inverters
Electronic oscillators